Seoul University most often refers to:

 Seoul National University 
 
Seoul University may also refer to:

 University of Seoul
 Seoul National University of Science and Technology
 Seoul National University of Education